The 1986 CCHA Men's Ice Hockey Tournament was the 15th CCHA Men's Ice Hockey Tournament. It was played between March 7 and March 15, 1986. First round games were played at campus sites, while 'final four' games were played at Joe Louis Arena in Detroit, Michigan. By winning the tournament, Western Michigan received the Central Collegiate Hockey Association's automatic bid to the 1986 NCAA Division I Men's Ice Hockey Tournament.

Format
The tournament featured three rounds of play. The team that finished below eighth place in the standings was not eligible for postseason play. In the quarterfinals, the first and eighth seeds, the second and seventh seeds, the third seed and sixth seeds and the fourth seed and fifth seeds played a best-of-three series, with the winners advancing to the semifinals. In the semifinals, the remaining highest and lowest seeds and second highest and second lowest seeds play a single-game, with the winners advancing to the finals. The tournament champion receives an automatic bid to the 1986 NCAA Division I Men's Ice Hockey Tournament.

Conference standings
Note: GP = Games played; W = Wins; L = Losses; T = Ties; PTS = Points; GF = Goals For; GA = Goals Against

Bracket

Note: * denotes overtime period(s)

First round

(1) Michigan State vs. (8) Michigan

(2) Bowling Green vs. (7) Illinois–Chicago

(3) Western Michigan vs. (6) Ferris State

(4) Lake Superior State vs. (5) Ohio State

Semifinals

(1) Michigan State vs. (4) Lake Superior State

(2) Bowling Green vs. (3) Western Michigan

Consolation Game

(2) Bowling Green vs. (4) Lake Superior State

Championship

(1) Michigan State vs. (3) Western Michigan

Tournament awards

All-Tournament Team
F Stu Burnie* (Western Michigan)
F Jamie Wansbrough (Bowling Green)
F Dan Dorion (Western Michigan)
D Chris MacDonald (Western Michigan)
D Wayne Gagné (Western Michigan)
G Bill Horn (Western Michigan)
* Most Valuable Player(s)

References

External links
CCHA Champions
1985–86 CCHA Standings
1985–86 NCAA Standings

CCHA Men's Ice Hockey Tournament
Ccha tournament